105P/Singer Brewster is a periodic comet in the Solar System. It was discovered in 1986, and received the name of 1986d under the old naming system.

Because 105P/Singer Brewster only comes within 2 AU of the Sun, during the 2012 perihelion passage it is only expected to brighten to about apparent magnitude 17.

The comet nucleus is estimated to be 2.2 kilometers in diameter.

The orbit of Comet Singer Brewster was altered significantly in August 1976 when it passed within 0.376 AU of Jupiter and will be altered again in August 2059.

The single discoverer bears a hyphenated surname (Singer-Brewster), but co-discovered comets bear the names of the co-discoverers linked by hyphens, e.g. Shoemaker-Levy 9, Swift-Tuttle, etc. In these cases, the IAU either removes one of the parts of the name or replaces the hyphen by a space.

References

External links
Orbital simulation from JPL (Java) / Horizons Ephemeris
105P/Singer Brewster – Seiichi Yoshida @ aerith.net
Elements and Ephemeris for 105P/Singer Brewster – Minor Planet Center

Periodic comets
0105
Comets in 2018
19860503